PGS Kissamikos F.C. is a Greek football club, based in Kissamos, Chania. The club colors are blue and white, while its crest featured a dolphin.

History 
Kissamikos was founded in 1926, representing the town and municipality of Kissamos, Chania. In 1994, the club won its first Chania Football Clubs Association First Division Championship, thus earning promotion to national competitions for the first time in its history. During the 1994–95 Delta Ethniki season, Kissamikos finished in 13th place, thus returning to regional competitions once again.

In 2012–13, Kissamikos achieved promotion to the Gamma Ethniki, the third tier of the Greek football league system, after finishing 6th in the Delta Ethniki Group 10. The club's tenure in third division was rather remarkable, as its first season in the competition saw Kissamikos finish in 4th place playing in Group E, while 2014–15 saw them finishing as champions of Group 4, thus earning their first ever promotion to the Football League.

Merger

Kissamikos quickly established itself in the competition, managing to outgrow, and eventually outperform its more prestigious fellow local competitor AO Chania. After the latter was forced to relegation to the Gamma Ethniki by the Hellenic Football Federation for failing to renew its league participation certificate, Kissamikos owner at the time Antonis Rokakis proposed a merger of the two clubs in an attempt to form a new, strong outfit to represent the region, and more specifically the city of Chania (as the region's competitor in the Greek Superleague, Platanias is based in the neighboring town and municipality of Platanias). The merger was eventually approved on 19 August 2017. The club was renamed to AO Chania − Kissamikos, and according to the Greek laws of football club mergers, would retain Kissamikos' original crest and colors.

Honors

Domestic Titles and honors
 Gamma Ethniki: (1)
 2014–15
 Chania Champions: (4)
 1993–1994, 1996–1997, 2000–2001, 2011–2012
 Chania Cup Winners: (1)
 1998–1999
 Chania Super Cup Winners: (1)
 2012

Notable former players

Greece
 Filippos Darlas
 Michail Fragoulakis
 Giannis Taralidis
Argentina
 Franco Calero
 Ricardo Verón

References

External links
Official website

 
Association football clubs established in 1926
1926 establishments in Greece
Chania (regional unit)